Halford–Hayner Farmstead is a historic home and farm located near Troy, Rensselaer County, New York. The  farmhouse was built between about 1835 and 1850, and consists of a 1 1/2-story, five bay, frame main block with a later two-story rear ell. Also on the property are the contributing shed (c. 1900), ice house (c. 1900), main barn group (c. 1800–1815, c. 1820–1840, c. 1870), wagon / tool barn (c. 1830-1850), hay barn (c. 1870-1900), and shop / garage (c. 1915).

It was listed on the National Register of Historic Places in 2013.

References

Farms on the National Register of Historic Places in New York (state)
1800 establishments in New York (state)
Houses completed in 1850
Buildings and structures in Rensselaer County, New York
National Register of Historic Places in Troy, New York